Vyacheslav Rubin (born 16 February 1966) is a Russian weightlifter. He competed in the men's heavyweight I event at the 1996 Summer Olympics.

References

1966 births
Living people
Russian male weightlifters
Olympic weightlifters of Russia
Weightlifters at the 1996 Summer Olympics
Place of birth missing (living people)
20th-century Russian people
21st-century Russian people